NCG Banco, S.A. was a financial institution founded in Galicia on September 14, 2011, as a result of Novacaixagalicia banking activity spin-off.

With €70.269 million in assets, 5.946 professionals, 2.7 million customers and a commercial structure made up by 919 branches spread all around the Spanish country and eleven countries of Europe and the Americas, NCG Banco, S.A. was the head of one of the leading Spanish financial groups.

NCG Banco, S.A. operated as Novagalicia Banco in Galicia, Asturias and León and as EVO Banco in the rest of Spain.

The Singular Assets Management Unit closes the corporate structure, taking charge of distressed and non strategic assets, non-performing, substandard, repossessed assets and buildings for own use. And also, the wholesale business manages corporate banking, operations in financial markets and treasury management.

Moreover, NCG Banco, S.A. took part as a shareholder in more than 220 businesses, through its industrial section NCG Corporación.

History 
NCG Banco, S.A. came from the banking entity Novacaixagalicia that came from the merger of the saving banks Caixa Galicia and Caixanova on December 1, 2010. The financial requirements, set out in the Royal Law decree 2/2011, bring about the transformation of Novacaixagalicia into a bank as a way to enable its market capitalisation.

NCG Banco, S.A. was born on September 14, 2011. In this new period, José María Castellano becomes the executive president of the entity and César González-Bueno Mayer the chief executive officer. NCG Banco, S.A. appears as the first institution in the financial history of Galicia that uses the Galician language for its foundational deed.

On October 10, 2011, the Fund for Orderly Bank Restructuring (FROB II) bought €2.465 million in NCG Banco, a 93% stake. The new funds were added to the €1.714 million provided by Novacaixagalicia, resulting a €4.180M total equity, €5.275M core capital and 10.45% risks weight assets (RWA), with 15.67% solvency rate.

On October 19, 2011, NCG Banco, S.A. launched its new commercial brand Novagalicia Banco under the advertising slogan “A new bank with lifetime clients”.

As of November 14, it started to work with two different commercial brands and two specialized business models: Novagalicia Banco, in Galicia and the international market, and NGB, in the rest of Spain. This strategic turn encloses the creation of two new business areas: one specialized in the corporate banking; and another as a Singular Assets Management Unit, specialized in distressed and non strategic assets.

On January 12, 2012, 17 Galician investors took a stake in the bank, buying 2.59% in equity. Thereafter, bank shareholders are the Fund for Orderly Bank Restructuring with a 90.57%, private investors with a 2,59% and Novacaixagalicia with a 6,84%.

On March 12, NCG Banco, S.A. started to operate outside Galicia under the commercial brand EVO Banco. During the first running-in four weeks it gained 8.920 customers and €70 million.

On March 22, NCG Banco, S.A. and its union representatives came to an agreement to avoid forced layoff. .

July 12, 2012, NCG Banco, S.A. released an advertising campaign in media in which it apologizes to clients for past mistakes.

Banking brands 

 Novagalicia Banco is the commercial brand for Galicia, Asturias and León
 EVO Banco is the commercial brand for the rest of Spain

Head office 

NCG Banco S.A. had two operating head offices. The social and tax address was located in A Coruña and the institutional and business address was in Vigo.

Staff 

The company staff was made up of 5,946 professionals.

Branches 

NCG Banco, S.A. had a retail network of 919 operative offices spread in the following manner:
 Spain: 900
Novagalicia network: 680
EVO/NGB network: 220
 Global environment (Europe and Americas): 10
 Global environment delegations (Europe and Americas): 9

It also had 1,494 ATMs and 36,913 point-of-sale terminals.

Financial report

Capital stock ownership

Customers 
NCG Banco, S.A. has 2.7 million customers: 338,000 are companies and self-employed workers (data last updated: December 2011) and 2.367.051 are families. In 2011, 171,271 people became active customers. Detail of the customers base:

 Outstanding companies: 3.802
 Public service: 2.597
 Small and medium-sized enterprises: 32.098
 Micro, small and medium-sized enterprises and associations: 115.698
 Self-employed: 183.450
 Families: 2.367.051

Government bodies

Board of directors 

FROB: 1 director with 2 dealers: José Borrue and José Antonio Portugal

Investment portfolio

See also 

 Novagalicia Banco
 EVO Banco
 Fund for the Orderly Bank Restructuring

References 

Defunct banks of Spain
companies based in Galicia (Spain)